Rain Down! is the fourth contemporary worship music album originally released in the U.S. with worship leader Alvin Slaughter by Integrity/Hosanna! Music. The album was released in 2000. It was recorded live during worship experiences from Tennessee, to New York to Trinidad. “Rain Down” features hundreds of worshipers from varying denominations.

Track listing
Shout
Speak Lord
I'm Talking 'Bout Jesus
Bless This Time
Who Can Satisfy
I Believe The Promise
I Will Run To You
Holy Spirit Rain Down
We've Come To Worship The Lord
He Alone Is Worthy
You Are The One
Suddenly

Credits
Producers:
 Paul Mills
 Alvin Slaughter

Executive Producer:
 Don Moen
 Chris Thomason

Arrangers:
 Paul Mills - Track, Vocal, String Arrangement
 Alin Slaughter - Track, Vocal Arrangement
 Michael Mellett - Vocal Arrangement
 Craig Young
 Chris Rodriguez - Vocal Arrangement
 Roger Ryan
 Dave Horton - Vocal Arrangement

A&R Director:
 Chris Thomason

Worship Leader:
 Alvin Slaughter

Liner Notes:
 Michael Coleman
 Alvin Slaughter

Musicians:
 Steve Brewster - Drums and Percussion
 Chris Rodriguez - Guitar
 Blair Masters - Keyboards
 Jerry McPherson - Guitar
 Jackie Street - Bass
 Roger Ryan - Keyboards
 The Nashville String Machine - Strings
 Carl Gorodetzky - Conductor

Vocals (Background): 
 Chris Rodriguez
 Michael Mellett
 Lisa Bevill
 Wendy Moten

Choir:
 "The Lee College Campus Choir"
 Dave Horton - Director
 Bobby Soverall - Director

Engineers: 
 Paul Mills - Mixing engineer
 Jeff Pitzer - Engineer

2000 live albums
Alvin Slaughter albums